Area codes 570 and 272 are telephone area codes in the North American Numbering Plan (NANP) for the northeast quadrant of the U.S. state of Pennsylvania. The numbering plan area (NPA) includes the cities or towns of Scranton, Wilkes-Barre, Williamsport, Stroudsburg, East Stroudsburg, Pittston, Carbondale, Hazleton, Clarks Summit, Towanda, Bloomsburg, Sayre, Tunkhannock, Berwick, Milford, Montrose, Honesdale, Pocono Pines, Nanticoke, Tamaqua, Shavertown, Dallas, Mahanoy City, Sunbury, Jim Thorpe, and extends as far south as Pottsville and as far west as Lock Haven. Area code 570 was created in 1998 in an split of area code 717, one of the original North American area codes. In 2013, the numbering plan area received a second area code, 272, creating an overlay plan, which required ten-digit dialing for the area.

History
When the American Telephone and Telegraph Company (AT&T) organized the telephone networks of North American with a universal telephone numbering plan in 1947, Pennsylvania was divided into four numbering plan areas, which received the area codes 215, 412, 717, and 814. Area code 717 was assigned to the eastern half of the Commonwealth, excluding the Delaware and Lehigh Valleys.

Area code 570 was created when the 717 numbering plan area was divided on December 5, 1998. It was the first new Pennsylvania area code created outside Philadelphia and Pittsburgh since the implementation of the area code system.

In 2009, it was projected that 570 would run out of numbers in the third quarter of 2011. The Pennsylvania Public Utility Commission (PUC) considered four options: an overlay plan and three configurations of dividing.  Two of the splits would have left Scranton and Wilkes-Barre, the two largest cities in the territory, with the same area code.   On July 15, 2010, the PUC decided that the new area code, 272, would be implemented as an overlay. The area code entered service on March 28, 2013. Ten-digit dialing became mandatory in northeastern Pennsylvania on September 21, 2013.

In 2015, only eleven unassigned central office prefixes remained in 570. By 2017, only one exchange was left in February, and that exchange was assigned by May.

Service area

Counties 
Locations are approximate. Area code 570/272 may only cover a portion of these counties, and it may spill into neighboring areas not listed.

Bradford County
Carbon County
Centre County
Clinton County
Columbia County
Dauphin County
Juniata County 
Lackawanna County
Luzerne County
Lycoming County 
Monroe County 
Montour County 
Northampton County
Northumberland County
Pike County 
Potter County
Schuylkill County
Snyder County
Susquehanna County
Sullivan County 
Tioga County 
Union County 
Wayne County 
Wyoming County

Municipalities 

Avoca
Berwick 
Brodheadsville
Carbondale
Clarks Summit
Dallas
Drums
East Stroudsburg
Elysburg 
Frackville
Freeland 
Gouldsboro 
Great Bend 
Hallstead 
Hazleton 
Honesdale
Jim Thorpe
Kingston
Lake Wallenpaupack
Lansford 
Mahanoy City 
Milford
Montoursville 
Moscow 
Mount Pocono 
Mountain Top 
Nanticoke 
Nescopeck 
Nesquehoning
Orwigsburg 
Pine Grove 
Pittston 
Plains
Portland
Pottsville
Sayre 
Scranton 
Shamokin
Shenandoah 
Stroudsburg 
Sunbury
Susquehanna Depot 
Tamaqua 
Tannersville 
Taylor 
Tobyhanna 
Towanda
Tunkhannock 
Weatherly 
West Hazleton
Wilkes-Barre
Williamsport

See also 
 List of Pennsylvania area codes
 List of NANP area codes
 North American Numbering Plan

References

External links 
 North American Numbering Plan Administration

570
570
Telecommunications-related introductions in 1998
Telecommunications-related introductions in 2013